Guilherme Lopes de Almeida (born 14 February 2002), simply known as Guilherme, is a Brazilian footballer who plays as a left back for Red Bull Bragantino.

Club career
Born in Brasília, Federal District, Guilherme played for two-and-a-half years for the youth setup of Cruzeiro before being released in 2018. He joined Red Bull Brasil in the following year, being initially assigned to the under-17s, and was kept after the merger of the club into Red Bull Bragantino.

Guilherme made his senior debut with RB Brasil during the 2020 Campeonato Paulista Série A2, attracting the interest of Real Sociedad due to his performances. On 20 October of that year, he renewed his contract with Braga until December 2024, with a R$ 25.760 million release clause.

Guilherme made his first team – and Série A – debut for Bragantino on 10 July 2021, coming on as a second-half substitute for Weverton in a 2–2 away draw against Athletico Paranaense.

Career statistics

References

External links
Red Bull Bragantino profile 

2002 births
Living people
Footballers from Brasília
Brazilian footballers
Association football defenders
Campeonato Brasileiro Série A players
Campeonato Brasileiro Série B players
Red Bull Brasil players
Red Bull Bragantino players
Clube de Regatas Brasil players